Batayurt (Botayurt) is a rural locality (a selo) and the administrative centre of Batayurtovsky Selsoviet, Khasavyurtovsky District, Republic of Dagestan, Russia. The population was 4,069 as of 2010. There are 75 streets.

Geography 
Batayurt is located 15 km northeast of Khasavyurt (the district's administrative centre) by road. Umashaul is the nearest rural locality.

References 

Rural localities in Khasavyurtovsky District